Jean V de Bueil (after 17 August 1405 and before 18 August 1406 - 1478), called le Fléau des Anglais "plague of the English", count of Sancerre, viscount of Carentan, lord of Montrésor, Château-en-Anjou, Saint-Calais, Vaujours, Ussé and Vailly, son of  Jean IV de Bueil and Marguerite Dauphine of Auvergne. He is the author of Le Jouvencel (c. 1466), a semi-autobiographical roman a clef based on his experiences during the latter part of the Hundred Years War.

Career
Jean de Bueil began his military career as a page of the Count of Narbonne and was present at the Battle of Verneuil. Later he served under mercenary captain Étienne de Vignolles, known as La Hire. He was made captain of Tours in 1428, later captain general in Anjou and Maine. Together with Joan of Arc, he successfully completed the siege of Orleans. In September 1432 he assaulted Les Ponts-de-Cé but failed to take it from the routiers of Rodrigo de Villandrando. He participated with the Dauphin Louis in a campaign against the Swiss in 1444 and was present at the battle of St. Jakob an der Birs. He was engaged in the reconquest of Normandy from the English and became admiral of France and captain of Cherbourg in 1450.  In 1453, he was present at the Battle of Castillon. In 1461, the new king Louis XI replaced de Bueil as Admiral with Jean de Montaubin, which began a rift which would lead to de Bueil joining the rebels during the War of the Public Weal in 1465. De Bueil was later reconciled to the king and was admitted to the Order of St. Michael in 1469 His last known act was to sign, on 31 May 1478 at his château de Vaujours, the document by which he confirmed certain rights of the prior of Charnes, a priory located in the county of Sancerre.

Le Jouvencel

Jean de Bueil wrote Le Jouvencel about 1466.  De Bueil intended that the work should have a didactic purpose for young noblemen.  He therefore uses an Aristotelian structure to his work, dealing with the hero's career in three parts, which reflect three elements of governance or discipline; the young soldier learns about ethics and self-discipline, the military commander learns leadership of men and the regent learns the governance of a country. Le Jouvencel joins several medieval military literature traditions; chivalric romance, treatises on chivalry and manuals on warfare.  De Bueil draws upon earlier writers such as Honoré Bonet and Christine de Pizan but also on his own military experience. In so doing, he gives a rounded image of how a professional soldier thought about and practiced war at the end of the Middle Ages.

Le Jouvencel has been widely quoted by modern scholars of chivalry and medieval warfare.  Traditionally, this has focussed on his writings on the nature of military life.  He viewed the life of arms to be ennobling in itself and, indeed, in some way, a route to salvation.  He is perhaps most quoted for his view on comradeship in arms

In recent times, greater attention has begun to be given to the practical examples given in the text, for example, how to conduct a raid or how to order an army on the march

References

External links
 Text of Le Jouvencel (in French)
 Matthieu E Chan Tsin ; Jean de Bueil: Reactionary Knight (Phd Thesis)
 The Companions of Joan of Arc

French generals
Counts of Sancerre
Viscounts of Carentan
1406 births
1478 deaths
People of the Hundred Years' War
Admirals of France